The Atlanta Jewish Film Festival is the largest film festival of any kind in the state of Georgia and is the largest Jewish film festival in the world. The 23-day festival is held in late winter at multiple venues in Atlanta, Georgia and in the suburbs of Alpharetta, Marietta and Sandy Springs. Contemporary and classic independent Jewish film from around the world feature at the festival.

History 
The festival was founded in 2000 by the Atlanta regional office of American Jewish Committee and continues to grow each year, with an estimated 20,000 attendees by 2010. In 2015, more than 38,600 attended the festival. The festival was incorporated as an independent 501(c)(3) non-profit in 2014.  Kenny Blank (son of Atlanta businessman Arthur Blank) serves as the executive director of the organization.

AJFF has honored Lawrence Kasdan (Screenwriter, Director, Producer) in 2016 and Itzhak Perlman (World renowned Israeli-American musician) in 2019 with AJFF Icon Awards.

The Atlanta Jewish Film Festival celebrated its 20th Anniversary in February 2020 with a lineup of 64 films from 17 countries.

In 2020, the Atlanta Jewish Film Festival launched a series of virtual programming prompted by the COVID-19 crisis.

Audience Award winners

 Festival

References

External links
Official website
Atlanta Jewish Film Festival on Facebook
Atlanta Jewish Film Festival on Twitter

Film festivals in Georgia (U.S. state)
Jewish film festivals in the United States
Film festivals established in 2000
2000 establishments in Georgia (U.S. state)
Festivals in Atlanta
Jews and Judaism in Atlanta
American Jewish Committee